The Operation Vijay Medal is a service medal that recognises Armed Forces personnel and civilians who were part of the larger Indian armed forces fraternity including the Army, Navy and Air Force, and who were involved or mobilized during operations at various field locations as well as Headquarters during Operation Vijay in 1999.

Criteria
The medal is awarded to all personnel of the Army, Navy, Air Force, Para Military Forces, Central Police Forces, Railway Protection Forces, J&K State Police Forces, Home Guards, Civil defence organizations and any other organization specified by Government in operational areas during Operation Vijay. The areas designated as operation areas included specific locations in Jammu and Kashmir, Punjab, Gujarat and Rajasthan.

Design
The medal is styled and designated as "Operation Vijay Medal." It is made of cupro nickel, is circular in shape, and is 35mm in diameter. The medal is worn suspended from a silk riband that is 32 mm in width that consists of a grey background divided into four equal parts by three 2mm stripes that are red, dark blue and light blue in colour. Embossed on the medal's obverse is the Jai Stambh

References

External links

Military awards and decorations of India
Awards established in 2001
2001 establishments in India
Kargil War